Joseph William Robinson Kasher (14 January 1894 – 8 January 1992) was an English footballer who played in the Football League for Accrington Stanley, Sunderland and Stoke.

Career
Kasher played for Hunwick Juniors, Willington, Crook Town before joining Sunderland in 1919. He established himself in the "Black Cats" midfield for three seasons after World War I playing in 90 matches. He joined Stoke in October 1922 and played 31 times in 1922–23 and 24 times in 1923–24. He then spent a season with Carlisle United and then two years at Accrington Stanley.

When he died in January 1992, six days before what would have been his 98th birthday, he was one of the oldest living former professional footballers in England.

Career statistics
Source:

References

English footballers
1894 births
1992 deaths
Accrington Stanley F.C. (1891) players
Carlisle United F.C. players
Stoke City F.C. players
Sunderland A.F.C. players
English Football League players
Willington A.F.C. players
Crook Town A.F.C. players
Association football midfielders
People from Willington, County Durham
Footballers from County Durham